Apiconoma is a genus of moths in the family Erebidae. The genus was erected by Francis Walker in 1854.

Species
Apiconoma mojui Laguerre, 2016 Brazil (Pará)
Apiconoma opposita (Walker, 1854) Brazil (Amazonas), Suriname, French Guiana
Apiconoma witti Laguerre, 2016 Brazil (Minas Gerais, Espirito Santo)

References

External links

Phaegopterina
Monotypic moth genera